Brombachtal is a municipality in the Odenwaldkreis (district) in Hesse, Germany.

Geography

Location
The community lies in the centre of the Odenwald near Bad König.

Neighbouring communities
Brombachtal borders in the north and east on the town of Bad König, in the south on the town of Michelstadt and in the west on the communities of Reichelsheim and Brensbach.

Constituent communities
Brombachtal’s five Ortsteile are Birkert, Böllstein, Hembach, Kirchbrombach (the community’s administrative seat) and Langenbrombach.

Politics

The municipal election held on 26 March 2006 yielded the following results:

Mayor
At the runoff election on 11 June 2004, Willi Kredel (SPD) was elected Mayor of Brombachtal with 66.9% of the vote.

Culture and sightseeing

Buildings
In the centre of Kirchbrombach stands the Evangelical church built in the mid 15th century with its polyptych, or “winged”, altar, built in 1518 and dedicated to Saint Alban. The church belonged until the Reformation to Saint Alban’s Abbey in Mainz.

Economy and infrastructure

Transport
The community is linked to the long-distance road network by Bundesstraßen 45 (Hanau - Eberbach) and 47 (Walldürn - Worms).

References

External links
 

Odenwaldkreis